The discography of the American electronic dance music producer and DJ Ookay consists of one studio album, two extended plays, sixteen singles and three music videos.

Studio albums

Extended plays

Singles

As lead artist

As featured artist

Music videos

Remixes
2018
 Portugal. The Man — "Tidal Wave" (Ookay Remix)

 Jay Rock — "Win" (Ookay Remix)

2019
 Max and Quinn XCII — "Love Me Less" (Ookay Remix)

2020
 Moody Good — "Jimmytics" (Ookay Remix)
 Rico Nasty  — "iPhone" (Ookay Remix)

2022
 Quix — "Run Like The Wind" (Ookay Remix)

References

Discographies of American artists
Electronic music discographies